Audley Coote (27 May 1839 – 4 June 1915) was an Australian politician.

Coote was born in Witham in Essex in 1839. In 1879 he was elected to the Tasmanian House of Assembly, representing the seat of George Town. He transferred to the Tasmanian Legislative Council in 1886, representing Tamar until 1895. He was later consul to Hawaii and Panama, and was twice awarded the Legion of Honour. He died in 1915 in Rylstone in New South Wales.

References

1839 births
1915 deaths
Members of the Tasmanian House of Assembly
Members of the Tasmanian Legislative Council